Monica Bello may refer to:

Monica Bello (basketball) (born 1978), Australian-Italian basketball player
Monica Bello (art historian), Spanish art curator for CERN